Swift J164449.3+573451, initially referred to as GRB 110328A, and sometimes abbreviated to Sw J1644+57, was a tidal disruption event, the destruction of a star by a supermassive black hole. It was first detected by the Swift Gamma-Ray Burst Mission on March 28, 2011. The event occurred in the center of a small galaxy in the Draco constellation, about 3.8 billion light-years away.

Studied by dozens of telescopes, it is one of the most puzzling cosmic blasts of high-energy radiation ever observed when it comes to brightness, variability and durability. It probably occurred when a star wandered too close to the central black hole in the galaxy, and was gravitationally torn apart and swallowed by it.
Timing considerations suggest that the tidally disrupted star was a white dwarf and not a regular main sequence star.

Debris now encircles the black hole 
in an accretion disk,
which launches bipolar jets at near the
speed of light.
Jet plasma emits the γ- and X-rays.
The beam of radiation from one of these jets points directly toward Earth,
enhancing the apparent brightness.
Repetitive dimming and softening of the X-rays
implies that the jet temporarily tilts away from us,
due to precession of the warped disk.

The jets drive shocks
into the surrounding interstellar medium,
resulting in a radio to infrared
afterglow.
Detection of the relativistically expanding afterglow
confirmed the identity of the host galaxy.
Observed linear polarization
of the infrared radiation
is consistent with synchrotron emission
from the afterglow shock.

"This is truly different from any explosive event we have seen before," said Joshua Bloom of the University of California at Berkeley, the lead author of the study published in the June 2011 issue of Science.

See also
 Supermassive black hole
 Tidal force

References

20110328
Draco (constellation)
110328A
March 2011 events